Cosoleacaque is a municipality in the south-east zone of the State of Veracruz, Mexico.

Cosoleacaque borders to the north on Coatzacoalcos and Pajapan, to the south on Minatitlán, to the east on Ixhuatlán del Sureste and Nanchital and to the west on Chinameca.

The weather is warm all year with rains in summer and autumn. Cosoleacaque's main products are maize and rice.

Cosoleacaque has a celebration in honor of Santa Cruz, patron of the town.

Transportation 
Minatitlán/Coatzacoalcos International Airport is located in Cosoleacaque.

Recent events

Former mayor Gladys Merlín Castro (2008-2010) and her daughter, Carla Enríquez Merlín, were shot and killed outside their home in Barrio Segundo on February 16, 2021.

As of March 5, 2021, 577 confirmed cases and 130 deaths associated with the COVID-19 pandemic in Mexico had been reported.

References

External links 

  Municipal Official webpage
  Municipal Official Information

Municipalities of Veracruz